The 2009 BWF World Championships was the 17th tournament of the World Badminton Championships, a global tournament in the sport of badminton. It was held at the Gachibowli Indoor Stadium in Hyderabad, Andhra Pradesh, India, from 10–16 August 2009. It was the first ever World Championships event to take place in India.

Badminton England withdrew before the first round due to a perceived threat of terror against the team. They were later joined by two Austrian doubles players. Lin Dan won the men's singles event, thus becoming the only player in badminton history to have won three men's singles world championship titles having done so consecutively in 2006, 2007, and 2009. Lu Lan won the World Championship title in the women's singles event. Cai Yun and Fu Haifeng of China won the World Championship title in the men's doubles event in a match which was later dubbed a "classic". Zhang Yawen and Zhao Tingting won the World Championship title in the women's doubles event, whilst Thomas Laybourn and Kamilla Rytter Juhl of Denmark won the World Championship title in the mixed doubles event.

Host city selection
Denmark, India, and Macau submitted bids to host the championships. India won the right to host the championships after the remaining candidates withdrew their bids.

Venue
The 2009 BWF World Championships were held at the Gachibowli Indoor Stadium in Gachibowli, Hyderabad.

Draw
The draw took place on 22 July 2009, featuring Chief Guest and Indian Sports Minister, Dr. M.S. Gill.

Participating nations

Austria
Due to security worries Austrian doubles pair Peter Zauner and Jürgen Koch decided against participation in the 2009 BWF World Championships. The BWF issued a special statement calling the withdrawals "an individual decision on the part of the players". COO BWF Thomas Lund said: "I believe it is a matter of concern that teams haven’t been consulting us before pulling out, because all the necessary information is available with us which will allay fears". Lund declined to blame the Indian media for their part in the withdrawals: "I can’t say India as hosts have any reason to be blamed for a false newspaper report with threat perceptions which triggered these reactions."

Denmark
Denmark, who had not achieved a BWF World Championship singles win since 1999, and a men's title since 1997, took part. The country last won the men's doubles title in 2003.

England
The English badminton team decided against participation in the 2009 BWF World Championships, citing fears of a "terrorist threat", although, according to Hyderabad's police commission "there's no real threat, only a perception". Badminton England chief executive Adrian Christy called it "an incredibly tough decision and one we didn't take lightly". Christy said: "We were not prepared to risk the safety of our players, coaches and staff in what we felt could have been a very volatile environment".

Medalists

Medal table

Events

See also
Badminton at the Summer Olympics

References

External links 
Complete results list

 
Badminton World Championships
World Championships
Sports competitions in Hyderabad, India
Badminton World Championships
BWF World Championships
Badminton tournaments in India
August 2009 sports events in India